Abayomi Matthew Kasali (born 28 February 1963) is a Nigerian minister. He is the founder and senior pastor of the Foundation of Truth Assembly headquartered in Lagos, Nigeria. Kasali is the founder of the non-governmental organisation 5 Loaves 2 Fishes.

Career 
Kasali is the senior pastor of Foundation of Truth Assembly headquartered in Lagos with branches in Abuja and Houston. He founded a humanitarian outreach; 5 Loaves 2 Fishes aimed at feeding the less privileged, providing clothing and medi-care to the less privileged in the society. His telecast, Impact Today airs on Silverbird Television.

Kasali is the President of Berean Ministers Group and secretary of the Nigerian Coalition of Apostolic Leaders (NCAL), an affiliate of International Coalition of Apostolic Leaders (ICAL).  He is also the current chairman of the Nigerian Pilgrims Commission and a member of the governing council of the University of Lagos.

Personal life 
Kasali is married to Pastor Sharon Adefunke Kasali and they have 2 children.

References 

Living people
1963 births
Converts to Christianity from Islam
Members of the Foursquare Church
Nigerian Christian clergy
Nigerian Pentecostal pastors
20th-century Nigerian people
21st-century Nigerian people
20th-century Protestant religious leaders
21st-century Protestant religious leaders